Elizabeth Cobbs is an American historian, commentator, and author of eight books including three novels, a two-volume textbook, and four non-fiction works. She holds the Melbern Glasscock Chair in American History at Texas A&M University.

She is also credited as screenwriter on the film adaptation of her book American Umpire, and as producer on the film adaptation of her book The Hello Girls.

Biography
Elizabeth Cobbs was born on July 28, 1956, in Gardena, California. Cobbs studied literature at the University of California, San Diego and graduated summa cum laude in 1983. She earned her M.A. and PhD in American History from Stanford University in 1988. While at Stanford, she won the David Potter Award for Outstanding History Graduate Student. Following graduation, she won the Allan Nevins Prize from the Society of American Historians for best dissertation on U.S. history.

She taught nine years at the University of San Diego, becoming chair of the History Department, and then accepted the Dwight E. Stanford Chair in American Foreign Relations at San Diego State University. She has been a Fulbright scholar in Ireland and a Fellow at the Woodrow Wilson International Center for Scholars in Washington D.C

Elizabeth Cobbs served on the jury for the Pulitzer Prize in History in 2008 and also served two terms on the Historical Advisory Committee of the US State Department from 1999 to 2006. She advised the government on the declassification of top secret documents and transparency in government.

Professional background

Elizabeth Cobbs started her writing career at the age of 15 as a community organizer and publications coordinator for the Center for Women's Studies and Services in Southern California. During this period, she founded and headed several innovative projects for adults and young people. In recognition for her efforts, she earned the international John D. Rockefeller Youth Award in 1979, at the age of 23 for exceptional service to humanity.

Books and publications

Elizabeth Cobbs has written over forty articles for media such as The Jerusalem Post, Chicago Tribune, The New York Times, Reuters, China Daily News, National Public Radio, Washington Independent, San Diego Union Tribune, The Washington Post, and several other publications. Her first nonfiction book was The Rich Neighbor Policy; she has since written five more books about American history and politics.

Cobbs also wrote and co-produced the PBS documentary American Umpire which is based on her book of the same name. It explores America's foreign policy "grand strategy" for the next 50 years.

Her first non-fiction book, The Rich Neighbor Policy, claimed the Allan Nevins Prize from the Society of American Historians and also the Bernath Prize from the Society for Historians of American Foreign Relations.

The Rich Neighbor Policy: Rockefeller and Kaiser in Brazil

Yale University Press published The Rich Neighbor Policy in 1992. It is a detailed explanation of the complicated relationship which existed between the private and public sectors in the operations of U.S capitalism in Latin America after the World War II. The book focuses on the activities of the manufacturing and financial magnates, Henry Kaiser and Nelson Rockefeller, in Brazil. The pair transferred American technology and techniques to enhance the development of Brazil.

All You Need Is Love: The Peace Corps and the Spirit of the 1960s

Cobbs's next book details the people and politics behind the Peace Corps, and discusses themes of American idealism at work during the difficult realities of the second half of the twentieth century. All You Need is Love was published in October 1998.

Major Problems in American History, Volumes I and II

Major Problems in American History, in two volumes, introduces college undergraduates to the major events and phases of American history. It brings primary documents together with contrasting historical interpretations and challenges students to come to their conclusions. As co-editor with Jon Gjerde and Edward Blum, Cobbs has edited four editions of the book, selling over 100,000 copies since its first edition (Houghton-Mifflin, Cengage) in 2002.

Broken Promises: A Novel of the Civil War

Broken Promises: A Novel of the Civil War was published by Ballantine Books on March 29, 2011, the 150th anniversary of the firing on Fort Sumter. The historical novel explores diplomacy at a time of high tension during the war. The book won the San Diego Book Award and also Director's Mention for the Langum Prize in American Historical Fiction.

American Umpire

American Umpire, a reinterpretation of the United States' role in global affairs, was published in March 2013.

The Hamilton Affair

Cobbs's novel The Hamilton Affair was published by Skyhorse Publishing in August 2016. The Hamilton Affair is based on the remarkable lives of Alexander Hamilton and his wife Eliza Schuyler, who survived him and raised their surviving seven children while working to improve the lives of impoverished families.

The Hello Girls: America's First Women Soldiers 

Cobbs's The Hello Girls: America's First Women Soldiers was published by Harvard University Press in 2017, the 100th anniversary of the U.S. entry into World War I. The book chronicles the Hello Girls' service in France during World War I with the United States Army Signal Corps and their later battle to receive veterans benefits for their service.

The Tubman Command 

Arcade/Skyhorse Publishing published Cobbs's historical novel The Tubman Command in May 2019. The work is a fictional retelling of the 1863 Raid on Combahee Ferry and the role of abolitionist Harriet Tubman in that operation.

Awards, grants, and fellowships

Elizabeth Cobbs has received several awards and recognition for her literary works. She has to her credit four literary prizes; two of the prizes are for American History while the other two are for fiction. Notable awards to her credit include:

•    2015–2018 Hoover Institution, Stanford University (Research Fellow)     
•    2010–2014, Hoover Institution, Stanford University (National Fellow)
•    2009 Langum Prize in American Historical Fiction (Director's Mention)
•    2009 San Diego Book Award, Broken Promise: A Novel of the Civil War Best Historical Fiction (Winner).
•    2006 "First Annual David M. Kennedy Lecture," Stanford University 
•    2003–2004 Fulbright Distinguished Professorship, Mary Ball Washington Chair, University College Dublin, Ireland 
•    1997 Bernath Lecture Prize, Society for Historians of American Foreign Relations (SHAFR).
•    1993 Stuart L. Bernath Book Prize, SHAFR, for best first book on the history of U.S. foreign relations (winner)
•    1993 Fellow, Woodrow Wilson International Center for Scholars, Washington, D.C.
•    1989 Allan Nevins Prize, Society of American Historians, for Best Dissertation on U.S. history: The Rich Neighbor Policy (winner)  
•    1986 David Potter Award, Outstanding History Graduate Student, Stanford (winner)

Filmography
•    2016 Producer and Scriptwriter, Documentary film "American Umpire" Shell Studios, LLC. WETA-Washington, Broadcast: Fall 2016

•    2018 Producer, Documentary film "The Hello Girls" Lincoln Penny Films

Op-eds, journal articles, book chapters, and encyclopedia entries
•    2018 "Why the Pulitzer Prize committee keeps ignoring women's history," The Washington Post, April 13 

•    2017 "'Hello Girls' answered our nation's call," Houston Chronicle, May 27 

•    2017 "International Women's Day - American women behind, as usual," The Hill, March 7 

•    2017 "Can History Prepare Us for the Trump Presidency?" Politico, January 22 

•    2017 "Woodrow Wilson's woman problem, a case study for the Trump era," Los Angeles Times, January 18 

•    2016 "Why today's victors don't want the spoils," San Diego Union, September 21 

•    2016 "For U.S. foreign policy, it's time to look again at the founding fathers' 'Great Rule'," Los Angeles Times, July 4 

•    2016 "Kuwait Showed the Value of Limited Intervention," The New York Times, February 28 

•    2016 "Brexit vote has global consequences," San Diego Union, June 11 

•    2015 "Why the U.S. Officially 'Believes' Pakistan's bin Laden Story," Reuters, May 20

•    2015 "Why the Letter to Iran Won't End Well for Republicans," Reuters, March 11

•    2015 "Why Boehner's Invite to Netanyahu is Unconstitutional," Reuters, March 2

•    2014 "Metaphor Meets Reality: U.S. and China Are Clearing the Air," Reuters, November 17

•    2014 "Avoid a Classic Blunder: Stay Out of Religious Wars in the Middle East," Reuters, September 16

•    2014 "The Sincerest Form of Flattery: The Peace Corps, The Helsinki Accords, and the Internationalization of Social Values," in Bruce J. Schulman. Making the American Century: Essays on the Political Culture of Twentieth Century America (New York: Oxford, 2014)

•    2014 "Court of Arbitration Could Help Solve Russia-Ukraine Crisis," San Diego Union, (March 26 )

•    2014 "Obama Must Escape the Cold War Syndrome," Chicago Tribune (Reuters). February 21 

•    2014 "America's Long Search for Mr. Right," Reuters, February 12 

•    2013 "Best Frenemies," Hoover Digest, January, reprinted from "Making Frenemies with Putin," Reuters, September 10 

•    2013 "Room for Debate: For U.S., There's An Easy Distinction," The New York Times, September 4

•    2013 "Patriotism: Revolutionaries Were Original Patriots," San Diego Union, June 29

•    2013 "George Washington's Benghazi Blues," Jerusalem Post, May 26 
    
•    2013 "Terrorism: Is American Imperialism Inviting It?" San Jose Mercury, May 3 

•    2013 "China as Peacemaker," Reuters, March 27 

•    2013 "Room for Debate: China, Japan, and South Korea's Turn," The New York Times, Op-Ed, March 13 

•    2013 "Come Home, America," The New York Times, Op-Ed, March 5 

•    2013 April 10, Elizabeth Cobbs debate Andrew Bacevich "Umpire or Empire"
    
•    2011 "Saddle Up for A Wild Western Ride, L'Amour Style," National Public Radio Website, "All Things Considered," May 16 
    
•    2013 "America's Civil War—and Syria's," San Diego Union, April 10 

•    2011 "A Dangerous Neutrality," DisUnion Blog, The New York Times, The Opinion Pages, 12 May 
    
•    2010 "How I Became a Novelist and Lived (Learned) to Tell the Tale," Passport, SHAFR, April 2010: 22–23  
    
•    2008 "The Ties That Bind: Personal Diplomacy in International Relations," Washington Independent, August 29

•    2008 "Spying: A US Psychic Dilemma" Washington Independent, June 20

•    2008 "When Did Talking Go Out of Style?" Washington Independent, June 4

•    2008 "The New Frontier" and "The Peace Corps," in Encyclopedia of the Cold War, Routledge: 626–627, 684–686
    
•    2006 "Returning to Containment," San Diego Union, March 8
    
•    2004 "John F. Kennedy and the Problem of Idealism," in John F. Kennedy: A Retrospective Look, Warsaw University Press (Poland): 119–125 
    
•    2003 "The Peace Corps," in Poverty and Social Welfare in America: An Encyclopedia, ed. Gwendolyn Mink, et al., ABC-Clio: 530–531
    
•    2001 "Nothing Wrong With Teaching What's Right About U.S.," Los Angeles Times, December 30

•    2001 "Decolonization, the Cold War, and the Foreign Policy of the Peace Corps," in Empire and Revolution: The United States and the Third World since 1945. Columbus: Ohio State University, 2001: 123–153 

•    2001 "The Assassins Revisited", San Diego Union, October 18
    
•    2001 The Oxford Companion to United States History, Oxford University Press, entry on "The Peace Corps:" 584
    
•    1999 "Playing the Role of Warrior and Priest," Los Angeles Times, April 11 
    
•    1998 "Building Nations with the Peace Corps," San Diego Union, April 26 

•    1997 "Diplomatic History and the Meaning of Life: Toward a Global American History," Diplomatic History. Fall 1997: 499–518  
    
•    1996 "Decolonization, the Cold War and the Foreign Policy of the Peace Corps" Diplomatic History. Winter 1996: 79–105  
    
•    1991 "U.S. Business: Self-Interest and Neutrality," in Abraham F. Lowenthal, ed., Exporting Democracy: The United States and Latin America. Baltimore: Johns Hopkins University Press, 1991: 264–295

Lectures, papers and commentary

•    2015 "Alexander Hamilton and the Early Republic," American History TV, C-Span3, April 22

•    2015 "Historians Writing Fiction," Round-Table Discussion, American Historical Association Annual Meeting, New York City, January 2

•    2014 Commonwealth Club (San Francisco), "Umpire or Empire: The History and Future of American Leadership," November 10

•    2014 C-Span3 American History TV, "The U.S. and World Leadership," October 10

•    2014 Denver World Affairs Council, "Umpire or Empire: The Costs and Consequences of World Leadership," September 9

•    2014 Miller Center Forum, University of Virginia: "An Empire of Influence Not  Arms," February 12
  
•    2013–14 Invited lectures: "America: Empire or Umpire, and At What Cost?" Massachusetts Institute of Technology, University of Pennsylvania, Columbia University, American University, Notre Dame, University of Texas, Texas A&M, Stanford University, Cornell University

•    2013 Victor Rocha Memorial Lecture, "American Umpire," California State University, San Marcos October 17
 
•    2013 Civil War Round Table, San Diego, "Friends, Enemies, and Countrymen: Britain in the U.S. Civil War," October 16.

•    2012 Public Round-Table: "American Umpire," Miller Center Fellows Conference," University of Virginia, May 10

•    2011 Featured Speaker: 9th Annual Southern California Writers' Conference, Irvine, California, September 25
 
•    2011 Public Lecture: "To Compel Acquiescence: The Real Meaning of the Founders' 'Empire' of Liberty, 1648–1789," Harvard University and Boston University, March 29 and 30
 
•    2011 Miller Center Forum, "JFK and America's Peace Corps at Fifty," Miller Center Forum, University of Virginia

•    2010 Round-Table: "Educational Exchange and the Writing of International History," Annual Conference of the Society for Historians of American Foreign Relations, Madison, Wisconsin, June 26
 
•    2010  Panel: "What Has Obama Learned From History?" Annual Conference of the American Historical Association, January 8

Book reviews

Elizabeth Cobbs has written a number of book reviews.

References

External links
 Official website

American women historians
Living people
1956 births
Texas A&M University faculty
People from Gardena, California
Hoover Institution people
Historians from Texas
Historians from California